Eddie Daly (born 1918) was an Irish hurler who played as a full-forward for the Waterford senior team.

Born in Lismore, County Waterford, Daly first played competitive hurling in his youth. He joined the Waterford senior team during the 1938 championship. Daly subsequently became a regular member of the starting fifteen and won one All-Ireland medal and one Munster medal.

As a member of the Munster inter-provincial team on a number of occasions, Daly won three Railway Cup medals. At club level he was a two-time championship medallist with University College Dublin.

Honours

Team

University College Dublin
Dublin Senior Hurling Championship (2): 1947, 1948
Fitzgibbon Cup (2): 1944, 1948

Waterford
All-Ireland Senior Hurling Championship (1): 1948
Munster Senior Hurling Championship (1): 1948

References

1918 births
UCD hurlers
Waterford inter-county hurlers
Munster inter-provincial hurlers
All-Ireland Senior Hurling Championship winners
Possibly living people